Carey v. Brown, 447 U.S. 455 (1980), is a decision of the United States Supreme Court dealing with freedom of speech under the First Amendment. A law passed by the state of Illinois had banned picketing in front of residences, but it had made an exception for labor disputes. A group of activists challenged the law after being convicted for protesting in front of the home of the mayor of Chicago regarding a lack of racial integration. The Court found that the law's distinction–based on the subject matter of a protest–was unjustified and unconstitutional.

Background 
The Illinois Residential Picketing Statute had been passed in 1967; the Chicago Tribune commented at the time that "Chicago Mayor Daley's home has been a prime target" of past protests.

In 1977, a group called the Committee Against Racism ("CAR") wanted to protest in Chicago against racism, and they were particularly upset at Mayor Michael Bilandic for not supporting busing as a way to speed up racial integration of Chicago schools. On September 6, they held a protest in front of the mayor's home over this issue, and about 20 people were arrested under the law, which stated:

Members of the group then sued the government (including the city of Chicago, Cook County, and the state of Illinois) to block the law's enforcement and to have it declared unconstitutional.

Proceedings in lower courts

In the district court 
The lawsuit was filed in the federal Northern District of Illinois. The members of the Committee Against Racism made a number of legal arguments, including that the statue was vague or overbroad, and Judge Grady disagreed with these, and the judge similarly disagreed with a number of technical arguments made by the government, such as waiver of certain issues because of the prior criminal trial (those who had been arrested simply plead guilty).

Judge Grady also noted the plaintiff's argument that the law's exception for labor picketing made the law unconstitutional. In general, the combination of the First Amendment and the Equal Protection clause prohibits most attempts to regulate the content of speech, and making distinctions between subject matters is one way to regulate content. The Supreme Court had ruled in the 1972 case Chicago Police Dept. v. Mosley that an anti-picketing law was unconstitutional because it had an exception allowing labor-related picketing, and their reasoning was that the law made a content-based regulation.

However, the judge thought the argument didn't work in this case because the mayor's house was not a place of employment (he implicitly assumed that labor protestors would not picket a residence that was unrelated to their work). In other words, the law regulated "the 'neutral' ground of place rather than the impermissible ground of subject matter." Finding no constitutional problem with the law, the court ruled against the plaintiffs, and they appealed.

In the Court of Appeals 
The Court of Appeals for the Seventh Circuit reversed, overturning the statute. The appeals court thought the district judge had misread the statute:

Consequently, the state of Illinois must have believed when passing the law that labor picketing at a residence "'is not an undue interference' with the peace and privacy of the home." Lacking any evidence that it would be more disruptive, picketing on other subjects could not be prohibited under this statute.

Decision of the Supreme Court 
By a vote of 6–3, the Supreme Court affirmed the Court of Appeals and held that the statute was unconstitutional.

Majority opinion 
Justice Brennan, writing for the majority, explained that the court was applying the same reasoning it had used in Mosley:

In its argument before the Supreme Court, the defendants had asserted that the state of Illinois was trying to provide "special protection for labor protests," and this justified the way the statute was written. The majority responded that, while this concern for labor picketing was "commendable", it in no way justified a content-based restriction on speech, and the argument even acknowledged that the law intended to distinguish speech based on its content.

Stewart's concurrence 
Justice Stewart wrote a brief concurrence to emphasize that he thought the outcome of the case was simply a matter of applying "the basic meaning of the constitutional protection of free speech," rather than applying the Equal Protection clause.

Rehnquist's dissent 
Justice Rehnquist wrote a dissent that was joined by Chief Justice Burger and Justice Blackmun. The dissent expressed frustration that, while the Supreme Court had many "hymns of praise in prior opinions celebrating carefully drawn statutes," in cases like this, the state would have been better off including no exceptions at all in its law. The law effectively had four exceptions:

 "First, if the residence is used as a "place of business" all peaceful picketing is allowed."
 "Second, if the residence is being used to "hol[d] a meeting or assembly on premises commonly used to discuss subjects of general public interest" all peaceful picketing is allowed."
 "Third, if the residence is also used as a "place of employment" which is involved in a labor dispute, labor-related picketing is allowed."
 "Finally, the statute provides that a resident is entitled to picket his own home."

Since it was uncontested that states were allowed to prohibit picketing of residences in general, the dissent felt that the majority's focus on the third exception was excessive.

See also 

 Chicago Police Dept. v. Mosley

References 

United States Supreme Court cases
United States Supreme Court cases of the Burger Court
United States Free Speech Clause case law
United States equal protection case law
1980 in United States case law
Legal history of Illinois
1980 in Illinois